Virgin Territory is a 2007 romantic comedy film directed by David Leland. It was the last film produced by Dino De Laurentiis. The film stars Hayden Christensen, Mischa Barton, Tim Roth, Rosalind Halstead and
Kate Groombridge. It is based upon Giovanni Boccaccio's 14th-century tale Decameron. The film's Italian title Decameron Pie pays tribute to both the title of the original source inspiration and to American comedy film American Pie. The film was released in France on December 12, 2007.

Plot
The film is set in Florence (Republic of Florence) during the Black Death. As in the Decameron, ten young Florentines take refuge from the plague. But instead of telling stories, they have lusty adventures, bawdy exchanges, romance and swordplay. There are randy nuns, Saracen pirates, and a sexy cow.

Pampinea is the daughter of a wealthy merchant who has died moments before the start of the movie. Lorenzo is a young man in town who is exceptionally good at gambling and is charmed by her beauty. Gerbino De Ratta is the head of the local thugs who robs anyone or steals anything that he sees stealable. Count Dzerzhinsky, from the city of Novgorod in Novgorod Republic now in modern Russia, is Pampinea's fiancé who she has never met. Their fate intertwines after Pampinea's father died and Gerbino robs Pampinea of her fortune, saying her father was in debt. The only way for the merchant's daughter to save her life was to marry him, according to Gerbino himself.

Lorenzo was being chased by Gerbino after he bested him at a gambling table, then took refuge in a convent by posing as a "deaf and dumb" gardener. At this convent, he has sex with all of the horny nuns, but only until Pampinea's arrival. Pampinea—trying to escape from Gerbino's grasp—ran to the convent for shelter. There she witnesses Lorenzo, whom she'd long had feelings for, having sex with the nuns and get jealous. She blindfolds Lorenzo and kisses him passionately out of love. But then, out of jealousy, she informs the convent's abbess of his deception, that he is actually neither deaf nor dumb.

The Count arrives in Florence only to be ambushed by Gerbino's men. All of his companions are killed, but he survives. Receiving a message from Pampinea's servant, Count Dzerzhinsky rides to Pampinea's father's mansion for the wedding, for he has been promised her hand in marriage. On the way, the young Count meets a skinny dipping Elissa—Pampinea's best friend, who is on her way to attend the wedding—and the two subsequently fall in love. The Count is led to believe Elissa is Pampinea.

Chased out of the convent, Lorenzo follows Pampinea to her father's mansion. There he confesses to her that he's fallen in love with the nun who kissed him whilst blindfolded, the woman whose face he never got to see. Later, Gerbino and his men arrive at the mansion and imprison Lorenzo. Pampinea agrees to marry Gerbino right that day to save Lorenzo, and thus Lorenzo is banished to the woods. There he meets Dzerzhinsky who is on his way to the mansion to be married to 'Pampinea' (actually Elissa) and the two team up to take out Gerbino's men. Gerbino himself dies falling into a large deep well inside the mansion.

Pampinea, in love with Lorenzo, refuses to marry Count Dzerzhinsky, only to realise moments later that the Count himself is actually in love with Elissa who has been posing as her. She happily then runs after Lorenzo and kisses him. Lorenzo realises that she is in fact the nun he's in love with and they hold their wedding that very day, with all of their friends attending.

Cast
 Hayden Christensen as Lorenzo de Lamberti
 Mischa Barton as Pampinea Anastargi
 Tim Roth as Gerbino Della Ratta
 Ryan Cartwright as Ghino
 Rosalind Halstead as Filomena
 Kate Groombridge as Elissa
 Christopher Egan as Dioneo
 Nigel Planer as Uncle Bruno
 Matthew Rhys as Count Dzerzhinsky
 Rupert Friend as Alessandro Felice
 Silvia Colloca as Sister Lisabetta
 Anna Galiena as The Abbess
 Elisabetta Canalis as Nun
 Craig Parkinson as Tindaro

Production
The film was co-produced by Italian producer Dino De Laurentiis and his wife, along with Nigel Green's Entertainment Film Distributors and Tarak Ben Ammar's Paris-based La Quinta. It was written and directed by Brit David Leland. De Laurentiis returned to Italy to film it. The largely British cast includes Mischa Barton and Hayden Christensen, along with Tim Roth playing the villain, "young actresses" Kate Groombridge and Rosalind Halstead, and British comedian Nigel Planer in a cameo as a nitwit named Uncle Bruno. The film was reportedly budgeted at $38 million.

It was produced under the working titles The Decameron, The Decameron: Angels and Virgins, Chasing Temptation, and Guilty Pleasures, before being released under the title Virgin Territory.

Release
The film was released in France on December 12, 2007, under the title Medieval Pie: Territoires Vierges. RAI Cinema acquired theatrical and television rights for Italy. It was released directly-to-DVD in the United States on August 26, 2008.

Soundtrack
Wolfman and the Side-Effects — "For Lovers" (featuring Pete Doherty)
Martina Topley-Bird — "Bless You"
Groove Armada — "But I Feel Good"
The Kills — "No Wow (Telephone Radio Germany)"
Basement Jaxx — "Lucky Star" (featuring Dizzee Rascal)
Italian X-Rays — "Art of Joy"
Micah P. Hinson — "Don't You Forget" (featuring The Gospel of Progress)
Blur — "Tender"
Martina Topley-Bird — "Da Da Da Da"

References

External links
 
 

2007 films
2007 direct-to-video films
American teen comedy films
American sex comedy films
British romantic comedy films
The Decameron
2000s English-language films
English-language French films
English-language Italian films
English-language Luxembourgian films
2007 romantic comedy films
Films based on works by Giovanni Boccaccio
Films set in Florence
Films set in the 14th century
French romantic comedy films
Italian romantic comedy films
Films directed by David Leland
Films produced by Dino De Laurentiis
Films produced by Martha De Laurentiis
Films scored by Ilan Eshkeri
2000s sex comedy films
Teen sex comedy films
Luxembourgian comedy films
2000s American films
2000s British films
2000s French films